Butters may refer to:

Places
United States
Butters, North Carolina, a census-designated place

Other uses
Butters (surname)
Butters Stotch, a character from the animated sitcom South Park

See also
Buttar (disambiguation)
Butter (disambiguation)